The following events occurred in November 1953:

November 1, 1953 (Sunday)
Born: Darrell Issa, American politician, U.S. Representative from California, in Cleveland, Ohio

November 2, 1953 (Monday)

November 3, 1953 (Tuesday)

November 4, 1953 (Wednesday)

November 5, 1953 (Thursday)

November 6, 1953 (Friday)

November 7, 1953 (Saturday)

November 8, 1953 (Sunday)

November 9, 1953 (Monday)

November 10, 1953 (Tuesday) 
Born: Guitarist Kenneth J Kettner in McHenry, Illinois

November 11, 1953 (Wednesday)

November 12, 1953 (Thursday)

November 13, 1953 (Friday)
Born: Andrés Manuel López Obrador, current President of Mexico, in Tepetitán, Tabasco, Mexico

November 14, 1953 (Saturday)

November 15, 1953 (Sunday)

November 16, 1953 (Monday)
Born: Griff Rhys Jones, Welsh comedian, in Cardiff

November 17, 1953 (Tuesday)

November 18, 1953 (Wednesday)
Born: Kevin Nealon, American actor and comedian, in St. Louis, Missouri

November 19, 1953 (Thursday)

November 20, 1953 (Friday)

The Douglas D-558-2 Skyrocket, piloted by Scott Crossfield, becomes the first manned aircraft to reach Mach 2.
Authorities at the Natural History Museum, London announce that the skull of Piltdown Man (allegedly an early human discovered in 1912) is a hoax.
Born: Faizul Suleiman Wahab to Abdul and Raheisan Wahab, in Berbice, British Guiana.

November 21, 1953 (Saturday)
Puerto Williams is founded in Chile as the southernmost settlement of the world.

November 22, 1953 (Sunday)
 Operation Castor: French paratroopers take Điện Biên Phủ.

November 23, 1953 (Monday)

November 24, 1953 (Tuesday)

November 25, 1953 (Wednesday)
 "Match of the Century": England loses 6–3 to Hungary at Wembley Stadium, their first ever loss to a continental team at home.

November 26, 1953 (Thursday)

November 27, 1953 (Friday)

November 28, 1953 (Saturday)

November 29, 1953 (Sunday)

November 30, 1953 (Monday)
 Kabaka crisis: Edward Mutesa II, the kabaka (king) of Buganda, is deposed and exiled to London, by Sir Andrew Benjamin Cohen, Governor of Uganda.

References

1953
1953-11
1953-11